is a passenger railway station  located in the city of Amagasaki, Hyōgo Prefecture, Japan. It is operated by the West Japan Railway Company (JR West).

Lines

Station layout
The station consists of two ground-level island platforms serving four tracks, connected by an elevated station building. However, since only local trains stop at this station, only inside platforms 2 and 3 are used, and outside platforms 1 and 4 are equipped with simple fences. Limited express trains, freight trains, new rapid trains, and rapid trains that operate during the morning rush hour on weekdays pass outside (platforms 1 and 4), and other rapid trains pass through platforms 2 and 3, where local trains stop.The station has a Midori no Madoguchi staffed ticket office.

Platforms

Adjacent stations

History
Tachibana Station opened on 20 July 1934. With the privatization of the Japan National Railways (JNR) on 1 April 1987, the station came under the aegis of the West Japan Railway Company.

Station numbering was introduced to the station in March 2018 with Tachibana being assigned station number JR-A50.

Passenger statistics
In fiscal 2020, the station was used by an average of 20,761 passengers daily

Surrounding area
Amagasaki City Hall
Amagasaki Public Health Center

See also
List of railway stations in Japan

References

External links 

 Tachibana Station from JR-Odekake.net 

Railway stations in Hyōgo Prefecture
Railway stations in Japan opened in 1934
Tōkaidō Main Line
Amagasaki